Lariniaria is a genus of Asian orb-weaver spiders containing the single species, Lariniaria argiopiformis. It was first described by M. Grasshoff in 1970, and has only been found in Russia, China, Korea, and Japan.

References

Araneidae
Monotypic Araneomorphae genera
Spiders of Asia
Spiders of Russia
Spiders of China